The freguesias (civil parishes) of Portugal are listed in by municipality according to the following format:
 concelho
 freguesias

Lagoa (Algarve)
Carvoeiro
Estômbar
Ferragudo
Lagoa
Parchal
Porches

Lagoa (Azores)
 Água de Pau
 Cabouco
 Nossa Senhora do Rosário
 Santa Cruz
 Ribeira Chã

Lagos
Barão de São João
Bensafrim
Lagos (Santa Maria)
Lagos (São Sebastião)
Luz
Odiáxere

Lajes das Flores (Azores)
 Fajã Grande
 Fajãzinha
 Fazenda
 Lajedo
 Lajes
 Lomba
 Mosteiro

Lajes do Pico (Azores)
 Calheta de Nesquim
 Lajes
 Piedade
 Ribeiras
 Ribeirinha
 São João

Lamego
Avões
Bigorne
Britiande
Cambres
Cepões
Ferreirim
Ferreiros de Avões
Figueira
Lalim
Lamego (Almacave)
Lamego (Sé)
Lazarim
Magueija
Meijinhos
Melcões
Parada do Bispo
Penajóia
Penude
Pretarouca
Samodães
Sande
Valdigem
Várzea de Abrunhais
Vila Nova de Souto d' El-Rei

Leiria
Amor
Arrabal

Bajouca
Barosa
Barreira
Bidoeira de Cima
Boa Vista
Caranguejeira
Carreira
Carvide
Chainça
Coimbrão
Colmeias
Cortes
Leiria
Maceira
Marrazes
Memória
Milagres
Monte Real
Monte Redondo
Ortigosa
Parceiros
Pousos
Regueira de Pontes
Santa Catarina da Serra
Santa Eufémia
Souto da Carpalhosa

Lisboa

Until 8 November 2012 
Ajuda
Alcântara
Alto do Pina
Alvalade
Ameixoeira
Anjos
Beato
Benfica
Campo Grande
Campolide
Carnide
Castelo
Charneca
Coração de Jesus
Encarnação
Graça
Lapa
Lumiar
Madalena
Mártires
Marvila
Mercês
Nossa Senhora de Fátima
Pena
Penha de França
Prazeres
Sacramento
Santa Catarina
Santa Engrácia
Santa Isabel
Santa Justa
Santa Maria de Belém
Santa Maria dos Olivais
Santiago
Santo Condestável
Santo Estêvão
Santos-o-Velho
São Cristóvão e São Lourenço
São Domingos de Benfica
São Francisco Xavier
São João
São João de Brito
São João de Deus
São Jorge de Arroios
São José
São Mamede
São Miguel
São Nicolau
São Paulo
São Sebastião da Pedreira
São Vicente de Fora
Sé
Socorro

Effective 9 November 2012 

 Ajuda
 Alcântara
 Alvalade
 Areeiro
 Arroios
 Avenidas Novas
 Beato
 Belém
 Benfica
 Campo de Ourique
 Campolide
 Carnide
 Estrela
 Lumiar
 Marvila
 Misericórdia
 Olivais
 Parque das Nações
 Penha de França
 Santa Clara
 Santa Maria Maior
 Santo António
 São Domingos de Benfica
 São Vicente

Loulé
Almancil
Alte
Ameixial
Benafim
Boliqueime
São Clemente
São Sebastião
Quarteira
Querença
Salir
Tôr

Loures
Apelação
Bobadela
Bucelas
Camarate
Fanhões
Frielas
Loures
Lousa
Moscavide
Portela
Prior Velho
Sacavém
Santa Iria de Azoia
Santo Antão do Tojal
Santo António dos Cavaleiros
São João da Talha
São Julião do Tojal
Unhos

Lourinhã
Atalaia
Lourinhã
Marteleira
Miragaia
Moita dos Ferreiros
Moledo
Reguengo Grande
Ribamar
Santa Bárbara (Lourinhã)
São Bartolomeu dos Galegos
Vimeiro

Lousã
Casal de Ermio
Foz de Arouce
Gândaras
Lousã
Serpins
Vilarinho

Lousada
Alvarenga
Aveleda
Barrosas (Santo Estêvão)
Boim
Caíde de Rei
Casais
Cernadelo
Covas
Cristelos
Figueiras
Lodares
Lousada (Santa Margarida)
Lousada (São Miguel)
Lustosa
Macieira
Meinedo
Nespereira
Nevogilde
Nogueira
Ordem
Pias
Silvares
Sousela
Torno
Vilar do Torno e Alentém

L